François Tanguy (23 June 1958 – 6 December 2022) was a French theatre director.

Biography
In 1982, he became director of the Théâtre du Radeau, founded in 1977. In 1985, the theatre moved to Le Mans and was renamed La Fonderie in 1992.

Tanguy advocated for undocumented migrants in Bosnia, for which he led a hunger strike in 1995 alongside Ariane Mnouchkine and Olivier Py.

Tanguy died in Le Mans on 6 December 2022, at the age of 64.

Pieces directed
Dom Juan (1982)
L’Eden et les cendres (1983)
Le Retable de Séraphin (1984)
A Midsummer Night's Dream (1985)
Mystère Bouffe (1986)
Jeu de Faust (1987)
Woyzeck - Büchner - Fragments forains (1989)
Chant du Bouc (1991)
Choral (1994)
Bataille du Tagliamento (1996)
Orphéon - Bataille - suite lyrique (1998)
Les Cantates (2001)
Coda (2004)
Ricercar (2007)
Onzième (2011)
Passim (2013)
Soubresaut (2016)
Item (2019)
Par autan (2022)

References

1958 births
2022 deaths
French theatre directors
Mass media people from Caen